Whittlesey Creek National Wildlife Refuge is part of a large wetland complex on Lake Superior, near Ashland, Wisconsin. These coastal wetlands are a significant part of the wildlife habitat and aquatic resources of the south shore of Lake Superior.

The refuge was established in 1999, and it is still being created. Its purpose is to protect, restore, and manage coastal wetland and spring-fed stream habitat. ,  are protected.

Restoration of coaster brook trout, a potamodromous fish native to Lake Superior, is one of the refuge goals. The refuge will also restore stream and wetland habitat to benefit other fish species and migratory birds.

The refuge is located immediately north of the Northern Great Lakes Visitor Center, which is operated by the U.S. Fish and Wildlife Service, U.S. Forest Service, National Park Service, Wisconsin State Historical Society, University of Wisconsin Extension Service, and Friends of the Center Alliance, Ltd. The Center serves as the headquarters and contact station for the refuge.

See also
Asaph Whittlesey

References
Refuge website

National Wildlife Refuges in Wisconsin
Protected areas of Bayfield County, Wisconsin
Protected areas established in 1999
Wetlands of Wisconsin
Landforms of Bayfield County, Wisconsin
1999 establishments in Wisconsin